Cove Rangers Football Club is a senior Scottish football club currently playing in the Scottish Championship. They are based in the Cove Bay area of Aberdeen and play their football at Balmoral Stadium, having left their former home at Allan Park in April 2015.

History

Cove were formed in 1922 and played in the local amateur leagues until 1985, when they became a junior team. However, the club applied and were accepted to the senior Highland Football League in 1986, where they played until winning promotion to Scottish Football League division 2 in May 2019, after beating Berwick Rangers 7–0 on aggregate in the pyramid playoff. They have also racked up a formidable reputation in the lower rounds of the Scottish Cup, reaching the 3rd round three times. In 2001 they won their first Highland League championship – but even more impressively won the 'treble' of Highland League, Aberdeenshire Shield and Scottish Qualifying Cup.

In the 2007–08 season, Cove reached round four of the Scottish Cup for the first time, beating Brora Rangers away 5–0, Keith 3–0 and Edinburgh University 1–0 on the way, before losing 4–2 to Ross County.

However, the south Aberdeen side claimed their second ever Highland League Championship with a 3–0 home win against Lossiemouth on 3 May 2008.

Cove Rangers were one of the clubs who prepared an application for entry into the Scottish Football League following Gretna relinquishing their league status on 3 June 2008. The other clubs were Annan Athletic, Preston Athletic and Spartans. Annan Athletic were eventually awarded the place, due to their superior facilities.

One of the club's most famous players is the young Scottish midfielder Paul Coutts who joined English League One club Peterborough United during the summer of 2008 for a nominal fee. Coutts won the club's Young Player of the Year award for the 2008–09 season and won eight caps for the Scotland under-21 squad, after being touted for a call up by his former manager Darren Ferguson.

In 2016 the club regained their Highland League crown. Due to the introduction of the 'pyramid system' in Scottish football, Cove elected to say goodbye to their Allan Park home due to the stadium not meeting SPFL minimum stadia requirements. This in turn meant the club played all of their games at an away ground with Inverurie Locos, Formartine United and Banks O'Dee offering the use of their facilities so the club could compete. Cove went on to win the league and advance to the first play-off game against the winner of the Lowland League, Edinburgh City. The tie was won by City 4–1 on aggregate who subsequently progressed to Scottish League Two after beating East Stirlingshire in the second playoff tie.

Back to back promotions and rise to League One
In the 2018–19 season they were promoted to SPFL League Two for the first time in their history after defeating Berwick Rangers 7–0 on aggregate in the League Two play-off.

In their first season in the SPFL, they won League Two after the season was terminated early due to the Coronavirus pandemic. This resulted in back-to-back promotions for Cove, with the club gaining promotion to SPFL League One for the first time.

Promotion to the Championship 
In their first League One campaign, Cove narrowly lost out on promotion by 4 points to eventual winners Partick Thistle, finishing 3rd in the League and losing 4–3 on aggregate to Airdrieonians in the Play-offs.

In the following season, Cove won the League One title by 7 points, only losing 3 league games all season, securing promotion to the Scottish Championship for the first time in their history.

Stadium 

From 1948 to 2015, Cove played at Allan Park, which was located in Cove. The ground had a capacity of 2300 spectators, with 200 on seats or benches. Its largest attendance was 2,100, in the league playoff in 2008–09 vs Deveronvale which they won 3–1 to lift the league title for the third year running. Allan Park was named after a local farmer, who sold the club the land on which they built the ground in 1948.

On Friday, 30 July 2010, an article was placed in the local Aberdeen paper, the Evening Express that Stewart Milne, the chairman of Aberdeen F.C., had bought Allan Park. This scheme was thrown into doubt, however, when Aberdeen City Council rejected an application by the two clubs to build a new ground for Cove Rangers that Aberdeen would also have used as a training ground. Nevertheless, on 18 April 2015, Cove Rangers played their final game at Allan Park following progress being made with Aberdeen City Council in terms of planning permission. In this game Cove marked their departure with a 4–0 victory over Fort William.  Allan Park had been bought by housing developers for a figure believed to be around the £3m mark. The sale also included a social club, also owned by the football club, which closed its doors the following day.

Cove then began construction of their revised new stadium. The new facility, known as 'Balmoral Stadium' is located next to a new secondary school, with the merging of Kincorth and Torry Academies into one larger school. In a clause made by Aberdeen City Council, this new school will have access to the new stadium's artificial pitch.

In July 2018, Cove moved into the Balmoral Stadium, having played home games at Inverurie Loco Works' ground in the intervening period. The first match at the Balmoral Stadium took place on 16 July 2018, but had to be abandoned after a Cove player was seriously injured.

Honours
Scottish League One
Winners: 2021–22
Scottish League Two
Winners: 2019–20
Highland Football League
Winners (7): 2000–01, 2007–08, 2008–09, 2012–13, 2015–16, 2017–18, 2018–19
Highland League Cup
Winners (6): 1994–95, 1999–00, 2004–05, 2014–15, 2016–17, 2018–19
Aberdeenshire Cup
Winners (3) : 2001–02, 2010–11, 2018–19
Aberdeenshire ShieldWinners (4) 1990–91, 2000–01, 2008–09, 2017–18
Scottish Qualifying Cup (North)Winners (2): 1990–91, 2000–01
Aberdeenshire LeagueWinners (6): 2000–01, 2008–09, 2010–11, 2011–12, 2012–13, 2014–15
Inter-League TrophyWinners: 2001–02
North Junior League First DivisionWinners:' 1985–86

Current squadAs of 31 January 2023''

On loan

Club officials

Technical staff
Manager: Paul Hartley
Assistant Manager: Gordon Young
Coach: Jimmy Boyle
Goalkeeping Coach: Derek Soutar
Fitness Coach: Tam Ritchie
Head of Youth Development: Gary Hake
Performance Analyst: Ryan Docherty
Physiotherapist: Aimee Clark
Kitman: Adrian Thomson

Management 
Honorary President: Alan McRae
Chairman: Keith Moorhouse
Vice Chairman/Finance Director: Graeme Reid
Director: Darren Anderson
Director: Grant Moorhouse
Commercial Manager: Angela Bruce
Head of Media & Communications: Richard Gordon
Club Secretary/Stadium Manager: Duncan Little
Director of Football: John Sheran

The club's honorary president Alan McRae served as SFA president from 2015 to 2019.

References

External links
 Official website

 
Scottish Professional Football League teams
Former Highland Football League teams
Scottish Junior Football Association clubs
Football clubs in Aberdeen
Association football clubs established in 1922
1922 establishments in Scotland